Darón Iskenderian (born 19 March 2002) is a professional footballer who plays as an attacking midfielder for USL Championship club Las Vegas Lights. Born in the United States, he is a youth international for Armenia.

Club career
Iskenderian  played as part of the LA Galaxy academy, before spending a year with Catalan club CF Gavà in their under-19 team. He returned to the United States to play with Real So Cal and later moved to the Barça Residency Academy in Casa Grande, Arizona.

In March 2022, it was announced Iskenderian had signed a USL Academy contract with Las Vegas Lights ahead of their 2022 season. He debuted for the club on 13 March 2022, appearing as a 53rd–minute substitute during a 0–2 loss to New Mexico United.

Career statistics

References

2002 births
Living people
People from Los Angeles
Soccer players from California
Soccer players from Los Angeles
Armenian footballers
Armenia under-21 international footballers
Armenia youth international footballers
American soccer players
American people of Armenian descent
Association football midfielders
Ethnic Armenian sportspeople
Las Vegas Lights FC players
USL Championship players